Guillaume Besse (born 7 August 1971) is a French entrepreneur and venture capitalist.

Biography and business career 
From 1999 to 2001, Guillaume Besse founded and was President of nFactory, news content syndicater later sold to Bertelsmann media group.

In 2002, he co-founded Dedicate Publishing, owner of DediCate magazine.

In 2003, Guillaume Besse co-founded Itélios, an IT services company specialized in e-commerce, based in France and Brazil, which he is board member.

From 2001 to 2004, Guillaume Besse was CEO of Prolitec SA, an R&D company specializing in fluid dynamics, liquid diffusion and fragrance diffusion.  In 2004 Prolitec SA was sold to Richard Weening's private equity company Quaestus, and moved from Montpellier and Paris to new headquarters in Milwaukee, Wisconsin in the US.  Prolitec Inc., the successor to Prolitec SA, is now a commercial ambient scenting company based in the US. Guillaume Besse is still shareholder of the company.

In 2006, Guillaume Besse cofounded Le Ker, a venture capital company.

In 2006, Guillaume Besse is the CEO of Entreprise-facile, a SaaS software editor for entrepreneurs and companies. In 2014 Entreprise-facile changes its name to become incwo.

Guillaume Besse is a coach for entrepreneurs at business schools, and a member of juries for entrepreneurs' competitions about entrepreneurship.

Bibliography 
Le Triomphe de la cigale, with Olivier Masselis and Emilie Le Pessot, Paris, Triomphe de la cigale, 2009

References

French chief executives
Businesspeople from Seattle
Businesspeople from Milwaukee
École Centrale Paris alumni
1971 births
Living people